Barrs Mills is an unincorporated community in Tuscarawas County, in the U.S. state of Ohio.

History
A post office called Barrs Mills was established in 1873, and remained in operation until 1956. The namesake Barr's Mills was a mill operated by David Barr on Sugar Creek.

References

Unincorporated communities in Tuscarawas County, Ohio
Unincorporated communities in Ohio